Time Lost is the third full-length Enchant studio album, released in September 1997.

Track listing
"Blind Sided" (Craddick, Leonard) – 6:24
"New Moon" (Craddick, Geimer, Leonard, Ott) – 8:22
"Under The Sun" (Leonard, Ott, Platt) – 7:29
"Foundations" (Ott) – 6:08
"Interact" (Craddick, Geimer, Ott) – 10:49
"Standing Ground" (Cline, Craddick, Geimer, Pamfiloff) – 5:29
"Mettle Man" (Geimer, Ott) – 8:24

Personnel
 Paul Craddick  – drums
 Mike "Benignus" Geimer – keyboards
 Ted Leonard – vocals
 Douglas A. Ott – guitar
 Ed Platt – bass guitar

References

External links
Time Lost at Allmusic

1997 albums
Enchant (band) albums
Inside Out Music albums